Boones Hill is a small unincorporated community in the Mount Airy Township of northern Surry County, North Carolina, United States, on the outskirts of the city of Mount Airy near Bannertown.  The community is centered on the intersection of Business U.S. Highway 52 (South Main Street) and U.S. Highway 52 Bypass (Andy Griffith Parkway) south of Bannertown. Local lore is that Daniel Boone camped on this hill.

Unincorporated communities in Surry County, North Carolina
Unincorporated communities in North Carolina